Akadimias Street (Greek: Οδός Ακαδημίας) (named after the Academy of Athens) is a major street in Athens that runs parallel to Panepistimiou Street and Stadiou Street from Vassilissis Sofias Avenue, in Kolonaki district, to  in the area of Exarcheia. Its total length is about 1.2 km. It has three lanes and runs almost diagonally from southeast to northwest. During World War II, it was officially renamed Roosevelt Street in honour of the US President Franklin Roosevelt, but the Athenians continued to refer to it by its original name.

Buildings along the street include the rear side of the classical trilogy of architect Theophil Hansen (University, Academy and National Library), the front side being on Panepistemiou Street. Buildings along the street also include the Olympia Theatre, an opera venue for the Greek National Opera and the church of the Life-giving Spring (in Greek). To the North-East is the district of Kolonaki.

Intersections 
 Kanaris Street
 Voukourestiou Street
 Amerikis Street
 Omirou Street (major)
 Sina Street
 Massalias Street
 Asklepiou & Riga Feraiou Streets
 Ippokratous Street (one way westbound)
 Mavromichalis Street
 Charilaou Trikoupi Street
 Zoodochou Pigis Street
 Emmanouil Benaki Street
 Themistokleous Street
 Tzortz (George) Street

References 

Streets in Athens
Odonyms referring to a building
Central Athens (regional unit)